Indian Gymkhana Cricket Club Ground is a cricket ground in Osterley, London (formerly Middlesex). which was founded in 1916.  The first recorded match on the ground was in 1932, when Indian Gymkhana played the touring Indians.  The ground has also held Middlesex Second XI fixtures, the first of which came in the 1935 Minor Counties Championship when the Middlesex Second XI played the Glamorgan Second XI.  From 1935 to 1936, the ground hosted four Minor Counties Championship matches, the last of which saw the Middlesex Second XI play Cornwall.

In 1986, the ground held a single Women's One Day International between England women and India women.

In local domestic cricket, the ground is the home venue of Indian Gymkhana Cricket Club.  The ground also has hockey and football playing facilities hosting the Indian Gymkhana F.C.

References

External links
Indian Gymkhana Cricket Club Ground on CricketArchive
Indian Gymkhana Cricket Club Ground on Cricinfo

Cricket grounds in London
Sports venues completed in 1916